Christian August I, Duke of Schleswig-Holstein-Sonderburg-Augustenburg (4 August 1696 – 20 January 1754) was a son of Frederick William of Schleswig-Holstein-Sonderburg-Augustenburg, who was himself a son of  Ernest Günther.

He served as provost of the cathedral chapter in Hamburg.  Later, he became governor of the Danish island Als, then General of the Infantry and Colonel of the royal guards in Denmark.  In 1731, Christian August I succeeded his childless uncle Ernest August.

Marriage and issue 
He married Frederikke Louise (1699–1744), the daughter of Count Christian Gyldenløve of Danneskiold-Samsøe.  They had the following children:
 Frederick Christian I
 Emil August (1722–1786): Lieutenant General in the Danish army
 Christian Ulrich (1723)
 Sophie Charlotte (1725-1752)
 Christine Ulrike (1727–1794)
 Sofie Magdalene (1731–1799)
 unnamed (1732)
 Charlotte Amalie (1736–1815)
 unnamed (1736)

Ancestry

References 
 Dansk biografisk Lexikon, Band III., p. 535f Digitalisat
 Eduard Maria Oettinger, Moniteur des dates, p. 176, Digitalisat

Dukes of Schleswig-Holstein-Sonderburg-Augustenburg
18th-century Danish military personnel
1696 births
1754 deaths
18th-century German people